Clarence Randolph ”Puggy” Bell (November 26, 1914 – February 19, 1985) was an American basketball player and coach. Bell never played in high school or college, instead he played in the YMCA league where he won several local and state championships. He later went on to play professionally, playing with the Passaic Crescents and the New York Harlem Yankees. Bell won the World Professional Basketball Tournament in 1939 with the New York Renaissance, when he was named the MVP, and in 1943 with the Washington Bears. In 2005, he was elected to the NYC Basketball Hall of Fame.

References

External links
Profile at statscrew.com

1914 births
1985 deaths
American men's basketball coaches
American men's basketball players
New York Renaissance players